José Ricardo Merlos Orellana (born September 25, 1983 in San Salvador) is a male athlete from El Salvador, who competes in archery. Merlos competed at the 2004 Summer Olympics in men's individual archery.  He was defeated in the first round of elimination, placing 35th overall. He is the younger brother of Cristóbal Merlos, who competed in archery for El Salvador at the 2000 Summer Olympics in Sydney, Australia.

References
sports-reference

1983 births
Salvadoran male archers
Olympic archers of El Salvador
Archers at the 2004 Summer Olympics
Living people
Sportspeople from San Salvador
Medalists at the 2003 Pan American Games
Pan American Games bronze medalists for El Salvador
Archers at the 2003 Pan American Games
Pan American Games medalists in archery